front loader may refer to:
 Loader (equipment), a form of tractor
 Washing machine, front loading type